is a neighbourhood in the city of Takatsuki in Osaka Prefecture, Japan. It is known for having one of The 100 Views of Nature in Kansai, .

Geography
Kanmaki is positioned between Mount Tennōzan and the Yodo River.

History
Kanmaki was historically significant as a place where high quality yoshi, a type of reed, was collected for the production of traditional Japanese instruments、in particular the Shō (instrument). Every February, a yoshiharayaki (reed burning) festival is held at "Udono no yoshi gen".

Transport
Kanmaki is close to Kammaki Station on the Hankyu Kyoto Line.

Education
 Takatsuki Municipal Kanmaki Kindergarten
 Takatsuki Municipal Kanmaki Elementary School

Shrines and temples
 Kasuga Shrine
 Honchō-ji Temple

References

Neighbourhoods in Japan
Takatsuki, Osaka